This article provides information on candidates who nominated at the 2021 Tasmanian state election, which was held on 1 May 2021.

House of Assembly
Sitting members at the time of the election are shown in bold text.

Bass
Five seats are up for election. The Labor Party is defending two seats. The Liberal Party is defending three seats.

Braddon
Five seats are up for election. The Labor Party is defending two seats. The Liberal Party is defending three seats.

Clark
Five seats are up for election. The Labor Party is defending two seats, although one was occupied by independent Madeleine Ogilvie after she declined to rejoin the Labor Party after winning a countback for a Labor vacancy.  Ogilvie has been sitting as an independent but has nominated as a Liberal Party candidate for the election.  The Liberal Party is defending two seats, although Sue Hickey resigned from the party to sit as an independent. The Tasmanian Greens are defending one seat.

Ben McGregor was initially named as a Labor Party candidate, but resigned prior to nominations closing.

Franklin
Five seats are up for election. The Labor Party is defending two seats. The Liberal Party is defending two seats. The Tasmanian Greens are defending one seat.

Dean Ewington was initially named as a Liberal Party candidate, but resigned prior to the call for nominations closing.

Lyons
Five seats are up for election. The Labor Party is defending two seats. The Liberal Party is defending three seats.

See also
 Members of the Tasmanian House of Assembly, 2018–2021
 Members of the Tasmanian House of Assembly, 2021–2025

References

Tasmanian Electoral Commission - Candidates

Candidates for Tasmanian state elections